32 Records was a record label established in 1995 by record producer Joel Dorn and attorney Robert Miller. Its 32 Jazz imprint released a successful series of compilation albums. It was named for Dorn's favorite sports number. It also released new material by artists such as The Jazz Passengers and established 32 R&B, 32 Blues, 32 Groove, and 32 Pop subsidiaries.

32 Records acquired the holdings of the Muse and Landmark labels, and established the 32 Jazz subsidiary in 1997 with the aim of re-issuing numerous jazz recordings. During the late 1990s, 32 Jazz released a successful series of inexpensive "Jazz for…" compilations. The first of these, Jazz for a Rainy Afternoon, was released in 1997 in conjunction with Elle. In 1999, it had become the top jazz label in the Billboard charts, before Verve Music Group merged its Verve and GRP holdings into a single output.

By 2000, Miller had become CEO of CDBeat, which owned 32 Records as a subsidiary. In March 2000, Dorn resigned from the company and formed Label M later that year. Upon Dorn's departure, CDBeat announced that it would discontinue 32 Records by March 2001, although in June 2000 it hired producer Todd Barkan to replace Dorn. CDBeat, in turn, would become Spinrocket and then ConnectivCorp. Savoy Jazz acquired the rights to the Muse and Landmark catalogs from 32 Records in October 2003, and by the end of the year, ConnectivCorp had merged with Majesco Entertainment.

Partial discography 

Source: "32 Jazz: A Checklist"

References

External links
 

Jazz record labels
American record labels
Defunct record labels of the United States